Runne may refer to:

Ossi Runne (born 1927), male Finnish trumpeter
Eha Rünne (born 1963), female shot putter and discus thrower from Estonia
Runne Mountains in the fictional world of Terry Brooks' Shannara series
Runne, old name of the municipality Rinn in Tyrol, Austria